Chainsaw Man is an anime television series based on the manga series of the same name written and illustrated by Tatsuki Fujimoto. The series, produced by MAPPA, was announced on December 14, 2020. It adapts the first 38 chapters of the manga series. The series is directed by Ryū Nakayama (director) and Masato Nakazono (chief episode director), with scripts by Hiroshi Seko, character designs by Kazutaka Sugiyama, and Devil designs by Kiyotaka Oshiyama. Tatsuya Yoshihara is serving as action director and Yūsuke Takeda is directing the art. Naomi Nakano is the color key artist and Yohei Miyahara is designing the screens. The music is composed by Kensuke Ushio.

The series follows the story of Denji, an impoverished young man who makes a contract that fuses his body with that of a dog-like devil named Pochita, granting him the ability to transform parts of his body into chainsaws. Denji eventually joins the Public Safety Devil Hunters, a government agency focused on fighting against devils whenever they become a threat to Japan.

The series was broadcast on TV Tokyo and other networks from October 12 to December 28, 2022. The opening theme song is "Kick Back" by Kenshi Yonezu, while each episode features a different ending theme song. Crunchyroll has licensed the series outside of Asia, and began streaming an English dub on October 25, 2022. Medialink licensed the series in Asia-Pacific.



Episode list

Home media release
Japan

Notes

References

External links
 Chainsaw Man at Crunchyroll
 

Chainsaw Man
Chainsaw Man